Enaam Ahmed (born 4 February 2000) is a British-Pakistani racing driver. He currently competes in the 2023 Indy NXT driving for Cape Motorsports. Ahmed previously competed in the 2022 Indy Pro 2000 Championship driving for Juncos Hollinger Racing and previously drove for RP Motorsport in the 2021 season.

Racing career

British F4 
In 2015, Ahmed made his debut in MSA Formula for Arden where he finished eighth overall, winning one race and the Rookie Cup in his first year racing cars. He also made occasional appearances in the SMP F4 Championship where he enjoyed even more success, picking up five wins and two poles.

For 2016, it was announced that Ahmed would be driving for Douglas Motorsport in the British Formula Three Championship. He finished fifth overall.

Toyota Racing Series 
Ahmed began 2017 taking part in the Toyota Racing Series with Giles Motorsport alongside Red Bull Juniors Luis Leeds and Richard Verschoor.

BRDC Formula 3 Championship 
In January 2017, it was announced Ahmed would switch to Carlin for a second season of British F3.
Ahmed made BRDC British Formula 3 Championship history by taking all three wins in the opening round of the season at Oulton Park. He also recorded three fastest laps across the three races to leave the weekend as championship leader with a perfect score of 95 points.

He went on to make it four wins from four races by taking victory in the opening race at Rockingham Speedway, before a further two wins at the next round at Snetterton Circuit saw Ahmed surpass the total number of wins achieved by a driver throughout the entirety of the 2016 campaign (5). Although Ahmed finished off the top step of the podium for the first time during a weekend in 2017 at Silverstone, two podium finishes allowed Ahmed to extend his lead in the championship standings.

Ahmed claimed his first pole of the 2017 season in a qualifying session at Circuit de Spa-Francorchamps, before going on to record his seventh and eighth wins of the season. A further second place finish stretched the Carlin driver's lead at the top of the drivers' standings to 82 points over nearest rival Toby Sowery.

At the next round at Brands Hatch, Enaam went on to take his second successive pole position, before sealing a lights-to-flag victory in the opening race. He recovered from eighth to finish on the podium in third place in the reverse grid race and recorded another lights-to-flag win – his 10th of the season – in the final race of the weekend.

Ahmed sealed the 2017 BRDC British Formula 3 Championship title at the penultimate round of the season at Snetterton, having claimed a further two victories to take his tally up to 12 – matching triple F1 world champion Ayrton Senna's total of wins from his own title-winning campaign in 1983. As a result, the Carlin driver became the series' youngest-ever champion at just 17 years old.

At the season finale at Donington Park, Ahmed won the 24th and final race of the season – his 13th victory of the campaign – to surpass the total number of wins Ayrton Senna achieved in 1983 (12). He ended the year on 654 points, 164 clear of his nearest rival.

European Formula 3 Championship 
In December 2017, it was confirmed Ahmed would contest the 2018 FIA Formula 3 European Championship with Silverstone-based Hitech GP, where he claimed two wins to finish ninth in the championship.

Japanese F3 
The following year, Ahmed moved to Japan to contest the Japanese Formula 3 championship with ThreeBond Racing but switched to B-MAX Racing with Motopark prior to the start of the season. There he claimed two wins at Fuji and Sugo to finish third in the championship behind teammate Sacha Fenestraz and TOM'S driver Ritomo Miyata.

FIA Formula 3 Championship 
Later that year, Ahmed partook in the FIA Formula 3 post-season test with Prema Powerteam. He ended up signing for Carlin Buzz Racing to partner Clément Novalak and Cameron Das in the 2020 FIA Formula 3 Championship. On 30 July, after 6 races, Carlin announced that Ahmed and his sponsors had departed from the team, being replaced by Ben Barnicoat.

Indy Pro 2000

2021 
On 2 April 2021 Ahmed announced that he would move to the United States to compete in the Indy Pro 2000 championship with RP Motorsport. It was initially announced as a part-time deal as it was unsure whether or not Ahmed would contest the full season due to sponsorship issues. Due to a lack of budget, Ahmed was no longer able to compete in the following races of the championship. However, it was announced on 29 September that Ahmed would compete in the final two races of the 2021 season with Juncos Hollinger Racing, replacing Manuel Sulaimán.

2022 
On 11 February 2022 Ahmed signed to compete in the full 2022 Indy Pro 2000 Championship season with Juncos Hollinger Racing.

Indy NXT 
Ahmed moved up to the Indy NXT for 2023, teaming up with Cape Motorsports.

Racing record

Career summary 

† As Ahmed was a guest driver, he was ineligible for championship points.

* Season still in progress.

Complete MSA Formula results 
(key) (Races in bold indicate pole position; races in italics indicate fastest lap)

Complete BRDC British Formula 3 Championship results 
(key) (Races in bold indicate pole position; races in italics indicate fastest lap)

Complete Toyota Racing Series results 
(key) (Races in bold indicate pole position) (Races in italics indicate fastest lap)

Complete FIA Formula 3 European Championship results 
(key) (Races in bold indicate pole position) (Races in italics indicate fastest lap)

‡ Half points awarded as less than 75% of race distance was completed.

Complete Macau Grand Prix results

Complete Japanese Formula 3 Championship results 
(key) (Races in bold indicate pole position) (Races in italics indicate fastest lap)

Complete FIA Formula 3 Championship results 
(key) (Races in bold indicate pole position) (Races in italics indicate fastest lap)

Complete Indy Pro 2000 Championship results 
(key) (Races in bold indicate pole position) (Races in italics indicate fastest lap)

Indy NXT 
(key) (Races in bold indicate pole position) (Races in italics indicate fastest lap) (Races with L indicate a race lap led) (Races with * indicate most race laps led)

Notes

References

External links 

2000 births
Living people
English racing drivers
British people of Pakistani descent
British sportspeople of Pakistani descent
SMP F4 Championship drivers
British F4 Championship drivers
BRDC British Formula 3 Championship drivers
Euroformula Open Championship drivers
Toyota Racing Series drivers
FIA Formula 3 Championship drivers
Indy Pro 2000 Championship drivers
Arden International drivers
Carlin racing drivers
Juncos Hollinger Racing drivers
Japanese Formula 3 Championship drivers
Koiranen GP drivers
RP Motorsport drivers
Campos Racing drivers
Motopark Academy drivers
Hitech Grand Prix drivers
R-Motorsport drivers
Pakistani racing drivers
Karting World Championship drivers
Indy Lights drivers
B-Max Racing drivers